UK Sport is the government agency responsible for investing in Olympic and Paralympic sport in the United Kingdom. It is an executive non-departmental public body sponsored by the Department for Digital, Culture, Media & Sport.

It was created following a "rock bottom" showing at the 1996 Summer Olympics where Team GB won just one solitary gold medal. Team GB and Paralympics GB went on to place third in the medal table at London 2012 and second in the table at Rio 2016.

Funding

UK Sport currently invests around £345m in summer Olympic and Paralympic sports and £24m in winter Olympic and Paralympic sports. These investments are spread over a four-year cycle ahead of the Tokyo and Beijing Olympic and Paralympic Games respectively.

The investments are made through Athlete Performance Awards which are paid directly to the athlete and contribute to their living and sporting costs and through central funding to sport National Governing Bodies to invest in coaches, facilities and sports science and medicine.

See also

 English Institute of Sport
 Sport in the United Kingdom

References

External links
 uksport.gov.uk, the organization's official website

1997 establishments in the United Kingdom
Department for Digital, Culture, Media and Sport
Funding bodies in the United Kingdom
Government agencies established in 1997
Non-departmental public bodies of the United Kingdom government
Organisations based in the London Borough of Camden
Sport in the London Borough of Camden
Sports organisations of the United Kingdom